Myxarchiclops is a genus of parasitic flies in the family Tachinidae. There are at least two described species in Myxarchiclops.

Species
These two species belong to the genus Myxarchiclops:
 Myxarchiclops caffer Villeneuve, 1916
 Myxarchiclops major Villeneuve, 1930

References

Further reading

 
 
 
 

Tachinidae
Articles created by Qbugbot